Super Subbarayan (born as P. Subbarayan) is a stunt director and actor in the Indian cinema, mainly in Kollywood and Mollywood. He has been working in the industry since 1980. Stunt masters and actors like Rocky Rajesh, Thalapathy Dinesh, Ponnambalam, Ram Laxman, Kundrathur Babu, Indian Baskar, Rajasekhar, Dhilip Subbarayan, Thavasiraj, and Dinesh Subbarayan have worked as fighters and assistants to him. His sons, Dhilip Subbarayan and Dinesh Subbarayan, are also leading stunt masters. He has won four Tamil Nadu State Film Award for Best Stunt Coordinator.

Filmography

 1983 Manaivi Solle Manthiram
 1983 Seerum Singangal
 1984 Kuva Kuva Vaathugal
 1984 Nooravathu Naal
 1984 Maman Machan
 1984 Nandri
 1984 Vengaiyin Mainthan
 1984 Pudhiavan
 1984 Kuzhandhai Yesu
 1984 Raja Veettu Kannukkutty
 1984 Naalai Unathu Naal
 1984 Nirabarathi
 1984 January 1
 1984 Ingeyum Oru Gangai
 1984 Uravai Kaatha Kili
 1984 24 Mani Neram
 1984 Sattathai Thiruthungal
 1984 Nyayam Ketkiren
 1984 Komberi Mookan
 1984 Pei Veedu
 1984 Vai Pandal
 1984 Unga Veettu Pillai
 1984 Enakkul Oruvan
 1984 Osai
 1985 Thiramai
 1985 Alai Osai
 1985 Sigappu Nila
 1985 Marudhani
 1985 Thandanai
 1985 Engal Kural
 1985 Chain Jayapal
 1985 Anbin Mugavari
 1985 Uthami
 1985 Santhosha Kanavukal
 1985 Kanni Rasi
 1985 Pagal Nilavu
 1985 Viswanathan Velai Vendum
 1985 Naan Ungal Rasigan
 1985 Naagam
 1985 Unakkaga Oru Roja
 1985 Pillai Nila
 1985 Japanil Kalyanaraman
 1985 Kaakki Sattai
 1985 Andha Oru Nimidam
 1985 Naan Ungal Rasigan
 1985 Neethiyin Marupakkam
 1985 Aan Paavam
 1985 Marudhani
 1986 Vikram
 1986 Paaru Paaru Pattanam Paaru
 1986 Karimedu Karuvayan
 1986 Nilave Malare
 1986 Vidinja Kalyanam
 1986 Palaivana Rojakkal
 1986 Muthal Vasantham
 1986 Manakanakku
 1986 Kanne Kaniyamuthe
 1986 Kovil Yaanai
 1986 Enakku Naaney Needhibathi
 1986 En Sabadham
 1986 Rasigan Oru Rasigai
 1986 Vasantha Raagam
 1986 Mythili Ennai Kaathali
 1986 Oomai Vizhigal
 1986 Mouna Raagam
 1986 Oru Iniya Udhayam
 1986 Thazhuvatha Kaigal
 1986 Mandhira Punnagai
 1987 Chinna Thambi Periya Thambi
 1987 Sirai Paravai
 1987 Kadhal Parisu
 1987 Velaikkaran
 1987 Makkal En Pakkam
 1987 Oru Thayin Sabhatham
 1987 Theertha Karaiyinile
 1987 Valaiyal Satham
 1987 Thangachi
 1987 Kalyana Kacheri
 1987 Jallikattu
 1987 Nayakan
 1987 Ninaive Oru Sangeetham
 1987 Uzhavan Magan
 1987 Ini Oru Sudhanthiram
 1987 Neethikku Thandanai
 1987 Manaivi Ready
 1987 Sattam Oru Vilayaattu
 1987 Enga Veettu Ramayanam
 1987 Parisam Pottachu
 1987 Aayusu Nooru
 1988 Oorai Therinjukitten
 1988 Ullathil Nalla Ullam
 1988 Therkathi Kallan
 1988 Paadatha Thenikkal
 1988 Paasa Paravaigal
 1988 Thaai Paasam
 1988 Poonthotta Kaavalkaaran
 1988 Nallavan
 1988 Jadikketha Moodi
 1988 Poovum Puyalum
 1988 Sudhanthira Naattin Adimaigal
 1988 Uzhaithu Vaazha Vendum
 1988 Thenpandi Seemaiyile
 1988 Ithu Engal Neethi
 1988 Agni Natchathiram
 1988 Paadatha Thenikkal
 1988 Urimai Geetham
 1989 Sonthakkaran
 1989 Thaai Naadu
 1989 Pick Pocket
 1989 Kaaval Poonaigal
 1989 Moodu Mandhiram
 1989 Paasa Mazhai
 1989 Pudhu Mappillai
 1989 En Purushanthaan Enakku Mattumthaan 
 1989 Kai Veesamma Kai Veesu
 1989 Paattukku Oru Thalaivan
 1989 Poruthathu Pothum
 1989 Dharmam Vellum
 1989 Rajanadai
 1990 Pulan Visaranai
 1990 Vaazhkai Chakkaram
 1990 Pudhu Padagan
 1990 Seetha
 1990 Sandhana Kaatru
 1990 Anjali
 1990 Siraiyil Pootha Chinna Malar
 1990 Thalattu Padava
 1990 Avasara Police 100
 1990 Mallu Vetti Minor
 1991 Sami Potta Mudichu
 1991 Thaiyalkaran
 1991 Nanbargal
 1991 Neengalum Herodhan
 1991 Vetri Karangal
 1991 Sirai Kathavugal
 1991 Vetri Padigal
 1991 Captain Prabhakaran
 1991 Maanagara Kaaval
 1991 Archana IAS
 1991 Vasanthakala Paravai
 1991 Thalapathi
 1992 Ilavarasan
 1992 Sivantha Malar
 1992 Innisai Mazhai
 1992 Chinna Pasanga Naanga
 1992 Idhuthanda Sattam
 1992 Tyagi (Hindi)
 1992 Suyamariyadhai
 1992 Suriyan
 1992 Ellaichami
 1992 Naalaiya Theerpu
 1992 Natchathira Nayagan
 1993 Vedan
 1993 Kattalai
 1993 Thalattu
 1993 Pon Vilangu
 1993 Thanga Pappa
 1993 I Love India
 1993 Chinna Jameen
 1993 Thiruda Thiruda
 1994 Indhu
 1994 Seeman
 1994 Namma Annachi
 1994 Athiradi Padai
 1994 Rasigan
 1994 May Madham
 1994 Raja Pandi
 1994 Thai Maaman
 1995 Aanazhagan
 1995 Pullakuttikaran
 1995 Makkal Aatchi
 1995 Ragasiya Police
 1995 Maaman Magal
 1996 Mahaprabhu
 1996 Vishwanath
 1996 Sivasakthi
 1996 Subash
 1996 Thuraimugam
 1996 Senathipathi
 1997 Kaalamellam Kaathiruppen
 1997 Kaalamellam Kadhal Vaazhga
 1997 Arunachalam
 1997 Raasi
 1997 Vallal
 1997 V. I. P
 1997 Periya Idathu Mappillai
 1997 Periya Manushan
 1997 Poochudava 
 1998 Vaettiya Madichu Kattu
 1998 Kannedhirey Thondrinal
 1999 Chinna Durai
 1999 Rajasthan
 1999 Anantha Poongathe
 1999 Kanave Kalaiyadhe
 1999 Amarkalam
 1999 Pooparika Varugirom
 1999 Maanaseega Kadhal
 1999 Taj Mahal
 1999 Olympian Anthony Adam
 2000 Narasimham
 2000 Vetri Kodi Kattu
 2000 Independence Day
 2000 Parthen Rasithen
 2001 Looty
 2001 Aanandham
 2001 Narasimha
 2001 Dheena
 2001 Star
 2001 Chocklet
 2001 Saivar Thirumeni
 2001 Mitta Miraasu
 2001 Love Marriage
 2001 Thavasi
 2001 Kadal Pookkal
 2001 Majnu
 2002 Alli Arjuna
 2002 Azhagi
 2002 Gemini
 2002 Raajjiyam 
 2002 Thamizh
 2002 Thamizhan 
 2002 Devan
 2002 Ivan 
 2002 Naina
 2002 Maaran
 2002 Junction 
 2002 Ramana
 2002 Solla Marandha Kadhai 
 2002 Bala
 2003 Dhool 
 2003 Thandavam 
 2003 Pop Carn 
 2003 Anbu 2003 Kadhal Sadugudu 
 2003 Anbae Anbae 
 2003 Saamy 
 2003 Jayam 
 2003 Aahaa Ethanai Azhagu 2003 Success 2003 Kadhal Kisu Kisu 
 2003 Jay Jay 2003 Soori 
 2004 Kovil 
 2004 Varnajalam 
 2004 Autograph 2004 Jathi 2004 Kuththu 
 2004 Machi 2004 Kudaikul Mazhai 2004 Attagasam 
 2004 Aai 
 2004 Jananam 2005 Dancer 2005 Ayya 
 2005 Ji 
 2005 Mannin Maindhan 
 2005 Maayavi 2005 Naran 2005 Manthiran 
 2005 Englishkaran 
 2005 February 14 
 2005 Chanakya 
 2005 Kundakka Mandakka 
 2005 Kasthuri Maan 2006 Pasa Kiligal 
 2006 Pachchak Kuthira 
 2006 Madhu 
 2006 Kaivantha Kalai 2006 Naalai 2006 Imsai Arasan 23m Pulikesi 
 2006 Kizhakku Kadalkarai Salai 
 2006 Sivappathigaram 
 2006 Veyil 
 2007 Aalwar 
 2007 Agaram 
 2007 Murugaa 
 2007 Muni 
 2007 Koodal Nagar 2007 July 4 2007 Mudhal Kanave 
 2007 Maa Madurai 2007 Kireedam 
 2007 Thirutham 2007 Nam Naadu 
 2007 Nenjai Thodu 
 2007 Kannamoochi Yenada 
 2007 Alibhai 
 2008 Indiralohathil Na Azhagappan 
 2008 Sila Nerangalil 
 2008 Vaitheeswaran 
 2008 Kannum Kannum 2008 Vedha 
 2008 Chakkara Viyugam 2008 Uliyin Osai 2008 Vaaranam Aayiram 
 2009 Naan Kadavul 
 2009 Perumal 
 2009 Vedigundu Murugesan 
 2009 Ninaithale Inikkum 2009 Solla Solla Inikkum 
 2009 Munnar 2009 Jaganmohini 
 2009 Adhe Neram Adhe Idam 
 2010 Porkkalam 2010 Thunichal 
 2010 Kutti Pisasu 
 2010 Ambasamudram Ambani 
 2010 Magizhchi 
 2010 Mandhira Punnagai 2010 Ayyanar 
 2010 Thenmerku Paruvakaatru 2011 Ayyan 2011 Avan Ivan 2011 Muni 2: Kanchana 2011 Yuvan Yuvathi 2011 Aayiram Vilakku 2012 Kantha 2012 Mattuthavani 2012 Marupadiyum Oru Kadhal 2012 Mirattal 2012 Neerparavai 2013 Sundaattam 2013 Annakodi 2013 Thulli Vilaiyadu 2013 Summa Nachunu Irukku 2013 Varuthapadatha Valibar Sangam 2013 Arya Surya 2013 6 Mezhuguvathigal 2014 Nedunchaalai 2014 Thalaivan 2014 Naan Thaan Bala 2015 Killadi 
 2015 JK Enum Nanbanin Vaazhkai 2015 En Vazhi Thani Vazhi 2015 Muni 3: Kanchana 2 2015 Kangaroo 2015 Eli 2016 Anjala 2016 Adida Melam 2015 Jithan 2 
 2016 Thirunaal 2016 Virumandikum Sivanandikum 2017 Neruppu Da 2017 Kodi Veeran 2019 Ganesha Meendum Santhipom 2019 Muni 4: Kanchana 3 2019 Vennila Kabaddi Kuzhu 2 2020 Adavi 2020 Sandimuni 2021 Chasing 2021 Udanpirappe 2022 Therkathi Veeran 2023 KannitheevuActor
 1983 Thangaikkor Geetham as Rogue (special appearance)
 1983 Seerum Singangal as Henchman (special appearance)
 1984 Madurai Sooran as Henchman (special appearance)
 1985 Kanni Rasi as Carrom Opponent (special appearance)
 1985 Aan Paavam as Super Subbarayan (in a special appearance as a Thief)
 1985 Neethiyin Marupakkam as Super (in a special appearance as a Henchaman)
 1986 Oru Iniya Udhayam as Subbu 
 1987 Kalyana Kacheri as Farm Owner (special appearance)
 1987 Anjatha Singam as Rogue (special appearance)
 1989 Pudhea Paadhai as Subbarayan (in a special appearance as a Henchman)
 1990 Thalattu Padava Rogue (special appearance)
 1990 Seetha as Henchman (special appearance)
 1992 Innisai Mazhai as Super
 1992 Chinna Pasanga Naanga as Bus Driver (special appearance)
 2006 Pachchak Kuthira as himself (special appearance)
 2015 Komban as Gundan Ramasamy
 2017 Kadamban as Moopa
 2017 Ivan Thanthiran as Minister Devaraj
 2020 Sandimuni 2021 Chidambaram Railway Gate 2021 Engada Iruthinga Ivvalavu Naala 2021 Chasing 2021 Kodiyil Oruvan 2021 IPC 376Extra fighter
 1980 Kaali 1982 Sakalakala Vallavan 1982 Pakkathu Veetu Roja 1982 Pokkiri Raja 1982 Kanne Radha 1983 Uruvangal Maralam 1983 Thoongadhey Thambi Thoongadhey 1983 Soorakottai Singakutti 1983 Malaiyoor Mambattiyan 1983 Mundhanai Mudichu 1983 Oru Kai ParpomAwards
Won
 1991 Cinema Express Award for Best Stunt Director - Many movies
 1997 Tamil Nadu State Film Award for Best Stunt Coordinator - Arunachalam 2001 Tamil Nadu State Film Award for Best Stunt Coordinator - Thavasi and Mitta Miraasu 2006 Tamil Nadu State Film Award for Best Stunt Coordinator - Veyil 2009 Ananda Vikatan Awards for Best Stunt Director - Naan Kadavul 2014 Tamil Nadu State Film Award for Best Stunt Coordinator - 6 Mezhuguvathigal and NedunchaalaiNominated
 2009 Vijay Award for Best Stunt Director - Naan Kadavul''

References

External links

Living people
Male actors from Tamil Nadu
Tamil male actors
Indian action choreographers
20th-century Indian male actors
21st-century Indian male actors
Year of birth missing (living people)